Esphyr Slobodkina (September 22, 1908 – July 21, 2002) was a Russian Empire-born American artist, author, and illustrator, best known for her classic children's picture book Caps for Sale. Slobodkina was a celebrated avant garde artist and feminist in the middle part of the 20th century.

Biography

Esphyr Slobodkina (ESS-phere sloh-BOD-kee-nah) was born in Chelyabinsk, Russian Empire in 1908. The Russian Revolution of 1917 created an unstable and dangerous climate for their Jewish family and she emigrated with her family to Harbin, Manchuria (China), where she studied art and architecture. Slobodkina immigrated to the United States in 1928. She enrolled at the National Academy of Design. It was there that she met her future husband, Russian-born Ilya Bolotowsky (they divorced in 1938). Along with Ilya, Slobodkina was a founding member of the American Abstract Artists group, which began amid controversy in 1936.  Like other Russian modernists, surrounded by ancient icons and a rich craft tradition, Slobodkina developed a lifelong appreciation of clear, rich colors, and flat, stylized forms.

According to her biography on the HarperCollins website,

In the late 1930s, Slobodkina began to write and illustrate her own children's books. Among her 24 published works Caps for Sale (1940) is considered a children's book classic; it has sold more than two million copies and has been translated into more than a dozen languages. Caps for Sale won the Lewis Carroll Shelf Award in 1958.  Other children's works include The Wonderful Feast (written in 1928, first published in 1955), The Clock (1956), The Long Island Ducklings (1961), and Pezzo the Peddler and the Circus Elephant (1967), reissued as Circus Caps for Sale (2002).

In 1948, feeling the need to get out of New York City and having saved some money, Slobodkina built a house in Great Neck, New York and moved there with her mother; they remained in the house until 1977. According to the Sullivan Goss art gallery website,

Slobodkina died in 2002.

Work
Through the 1930s Slobodkina developed her unique method of working in oils; a flattened, abstracted style that incorporated line, suspended or interlocking forms. But by the late 30s and 40s Slobodkina was using a variety of techniques and materials. Many of her works are collages and constructions, integrating paint, wood, plastic, and metal with everyday objects such as parts of disassembled typewriters and computers into amusing and often great art. Slobodkina's work eventually received high acclaim. In 1943, Slobodkina was included in Peggy Guggenheim's show Exhibition by 31 Women at the Art of This Century gallery in New York.
           
“Her life’s work pulled imagery and objects together into magnificent compositions time and time again," stated Harold Porcher, an authority on Slobodkina's art.  "I equate an artist like Esphyr to the American mockingbird. A mockingbird borrows and embellishes the songs of other birds around him. Often he changes the phrasing as he incorporates each element into an orchestration of birdsong. The abstract expressionist movement shifted the center of the art world from Paris to New York City, where it remains today. Slobodkina was a member of the early founders of American Abstract Artists which help to establish abstraction as a viable form of expression in America.

In the last years of the 20th century, Slobodkina continued her productivity, alternating serious work on abstract paintings with the more relaxing activities — to her — of creating sculpture, wall hangings, multimedia constructions, dolls and jewelry, often made out of old typewriter and computer parts.

As Anne Cohen DePietro wrote, "Traversing nearly a century of inspiration, it is Slobodkina’s enduring delight in the creative act and her single-minded pursuit of her aesthetic vision in a multiplicity of media that continues to enchant."

Legacy

In April 2000, at age 91, Slobodkina established the Slobodkina Foundation, dedicated to the conservation, preservation, and exhibition of art. The Slobodkina Foundation was designed to educate the public about Slobodkina's work and encourage others to pursue their dreams through awareness of Slobodkina's accomplishments.

Before her death in 2002, Slobodkina redesigned her home in Long Island, New York, as a mini-museum and reading room for children, a place where guests viewed more than 500 works of art for more than ten years. Although the Slobodkina Home was sold out of necessity in 2011, the charitable Slobodkina Foundation continues to preserve the legacy of Slobodkina's prolific, multifaceted career.

Her paintings, sculptures and literary works are part of the collections of The Metropolitan Museum, New York; the Smithsonian; the Philadelphia Museum of Art; the Heckscher Museum of Art; Hillwood Art Museum, the Whitney Museum, New York; the Northeast Children's Literature Collection, Thomas J. Dodd Research Center, University of Connecticut, Storrs, Connecticut; the Corcoran Gallery, Washington, DC; the Museum of Fine Arts, Boston; the de Grummond Children's Literature Collection, The University of Southern Mississippi; the New York Public Library; among others.

Bibliography 
Written and illustrated by Esphyr Slobodkina unless otherwise noted
 The Little Fireman, written by Margaret Wise Brown (W. R. Scott, 1938) — illustrator
 Caps for Sale (W. R. Scott, 1940)
 The Little Cowboy, written by Margaret Wise Brown (W. R. Scott, 1948) — illustrator
 The Little Farmer, written by Margaret Wise Brown (W. R. Scott, 1948) — illustrator
 Sleepy ABC, written by Margaret Wise Brown (Lothrop, 1953) — illustrator
 The Clock (Abelard-Schuman, 1956)
 Little Dog Lost, Little Dog Found (Abelard-Schuman, 1956)
 Behind the Dark Window Shade (Lothrop, Lee and Shepard Co., 1958)
 The Little Dinghy (Abelard-Schuman, 1958)
 Pinky and the Petunias (Abelard-Schuman, 1959)
 Moving Day for the Middlemans (Abelard-Schuman, 1960)
 Jack and Jim (Abelard-Schuman, 1961)
 The Long Island Ducklings (Lantern Press, 1961)
 Boris and His Balalaika, illustrated by Vladimir Bobri (Abelard-Schuman, 1964)
 Pezzo the Peddler and the Circus Elephant (Abelard-Schuman, 1967) — later retitled Circus Caps for Sale
 The Wonderful Feast (E. M. Hale, 1967)
 The Flame, the Breeze, and the Shadow (Rand McNally and Co., 1967)
 Billy, the Condominium Cat (Addison-Wesley, 1980)
 Spots, Alias Prince (E. Slobodkina, 1987)
 Mary and the Poodies (E. Slobodkina, 1994)
 More Caps for Sale with Ann Marie Mulhearn Sayer (HarperCollins, 2015) — published posthumously
 Caps for Sale and the Mindful Monkeys with Ann Marie Mulhearn Sayer (HarperCollins, 2017) — published posthumously

References

Other sources
Esphyr Slobodkina, Notes for a Biographer, a three-volume, limited edition autobiography.
Gail Stavitsky and Elizabeth Wylie, The Life and Art of Esphyr Slobodkina, Tufts Univ Art Gallery (1992), .
Ann Marie Sayer et al., Rediscovering Slobodkina: A Pioneer of American Abstraction, Hudson Hills Press (2009), .
JoAnn Conrad, Esphyr Slobodkina – Modernist (Children’s Book) Illustrator/Author, https://blogs.lib.uconn.edu/archives/2015/09/29/esphyr-slobodkina-modernist-childrens-book-illustratorauthor/

External links
 Esphyr Slobodkina – official website 
 American Abstract Artists – co-founded by Slobodkina
  (primarily previous page of browse report, under 'Slobodkina, Esphyr, 1908–' without '2002')
Esphyr Slobodkina Papers at the University of Connecticut Archives

Russian children's writers
Writers from Chelyabinsk
1908 births
2002 deaths
Abstract painters
Chinese emigrants to the United States
White Russian emigrants to the United States
Russian women painters
21st-century Russian sculptors
20th-century Russian sculptors
20th-century Russian painters
20th-century Russian women artists
Russian women children's writers
20th-century Russian women writers
20th-century Russian writers
Emigrants from the Russian Empire to China
People from Great Neck, New York
People from Hallandale Beach, Florida
Naturalized citizens of the United States